Roberto Primus (born 20 July 1949) is an Italian cross-country skier. He competed at the 1976 Winter Olympics and the 1980 Winter Olympics.

References

External links
 

1949 births
Living people
Italian male cross-country skiers
Olympic cross-country skiers of Italy
Cross-country skiers at the 1976 Winter Olympics
Cross-country skiers at the 1980 Winter Olympics
People from Paluzza
Sportspeople from Friuli-Venezia Giulia